Falsozorilispe is a genus of beetle in the family Cerambycidae. Its only species is Falsozorilispe linearis. It was described by Stephan von Breuning in 1943.

References

Pteropliini
Beetles described in 1943